Frederick Joseph "Fred" Page (14 August 1858 – 18 February 1929) was an Australian politician.

He was born in Richmond to tanner Seth Richard Page and Sarah Hearne. He left school early to become a tanner's apprentice, working in Granville before taking over a Botany tannery in 1887. He married Elizabeth Priscilla Barratt in 1880; they had three children. Page was a Botany alderman from 1898 to 1903 and from 1924 to 1928, serving as mayor in 1902 and 1928. In 1907 he was elected to the New South Wales Legislative Assembly as the Labor member for Botany. He opposed the 1913 referendum and was refused endorsement, but was re-elected anyway as an Independent Labor member. He lost his seat in 1917. He died at Botany in 1929. On his death, Botany council renamed the suburb of Pagewood in his honour.

References

 

1858 births
1929 deaths
Australian Labor Party mayors
Independent members of the Parliament of New South Wales
Members of the New South Wales Legislative Assembly
Australian Labor Party members of the Parliament of New South Wales
Mayors of Botany and Botany Bay